Asteronychidae is a family of echinoderms belonging to the order Euryalida.

Genera:
 Asteronyx Müller & Troschel, 1842
 Astrodia Verrill, 1899
 Astronebris Downey, 1967
 Lillithaster Thuy, Numberger-Thuy & Jagt, 2018
 Ophioschiza H.L.Clark, 1911

References

Echinoderm families
Phrynophiurida